Graham Victor Mattson is a New Zealand former rugby league footballer, and coach who represented New Zealand and later coached Tonga.

Playing career
Mattson was a Point Chevalier Pirates player in the Auckland Rugby League competition and also represented Auckland. Between 1964 and 1965 Mattson played in three test matches for the New Zealand national rugby league team. Mattson worked as a Police Constable.

Coaching career
Mattson began his coaching career in the 1970s with Point Chevalier before coaching the Mangere East Hawks, spending most of his time with the lower grades.

In 1981 Mattson was the head coach of the new Papatoetoe Panthers club and was on their inaugural committee.

In 1990 he was appointed the Auckland coach.

Mattson later coached Tonga at the 1994 Pacific Cup.

References

Living people
Auckland rugby league team coaches
Auckland rugby league team players
Glenora Bears players
Mangere East Hawks coaches
New Zealand national rugby league team players
New Zealand sportspeople of Tongan descent
New Zealand police officers
New Zealand rugby league coaches
New Zealand rugby league players
Papatoetoe Panthers coaches
Point Chevalier Pirates coaches
Point Chevalier Pirates players
Rugby league hookers
Rugby league locks
Tonga national rugby league team coaches
Year of birth missing (living people)